Jaunsvirlauka Parish is an administrative unit of Jelgava Municipality in the Semigallia region of Latvia.

Towns, villages and settlements of Jaunsvirlauka parish

References 

Parishes of Latvia
Jelgava Municipality
Semigallia